The Henry VII Lady Chapel, now more often known just as the Henry VII Chapel, is a large Lady chapel at the far eastern end of Westminster Abbey, paid for by the will of King Henry VII. It is separated from the rest of the abbey by brass gates and a flight of stairs.

The structure of the chapel is a three-aisled nave composed of four bays. The apse of the chapel contains the altar, and behind that, the tombs of Henry VII and his wife as well as of James I.  There are five apsidal chapels.

The chapel is noted for its pendant fan vault ceiling.

The chapel is built in a very late Perpendicular Gothic style, the magnificence of which caused John Leland to call it the orbis miraculum (the wonder of the world). The tombs of several monarchs including Henry VII, Edward VI, Mary I, Elizabeth I, James I, Charles II and Mary, Queen of Scots are found in the chapel.

The chapel has also been the mother church of the Order of the Bath since 1725, and the banners of members hang above the stalls.

History 

In the 13th century, a movement toward devotion to the Virgin Mary inspired the building of chapels in her honour across Europe. Henry III’s Lady Chapel at Westminster Abbey was part of this trend.  In 1502, Henry VII planned a new chapel.  The old one was demolished in 1502 and construction of the new foundation began January 24, 1503.

Henry VII had three goals when planning his chapel.  The first was to build a shrine to honour and hold the body of Henry VI, who was expected to be canonized. Ultimately, canonization did not occur and Henry VII and his wife, Elizabeth of York, were interred in the tomb intended for Henry VI. Second, Henry VII wished to dedicate a more elaborate chapel to the Virgin to replace the older, simpler structure; and third, he wanted a royal mausoleum for him, his family, and his heirs at an important religious site that would enhance his legitimacy as king and his legacy.

Henry VII allocated more than £14,000 for its construction between 1503 and 1509.  In his will, he stipulated that more funds were to be provided as needed.  The final cost of the chapel is estimated at £20,000.  According to one nobleman, Lord Bacon, “He lieth at Westminster in one of the stateliest and daintiest monuments of Europe…So that he dwelleth more richly dead in the monument of his tomb than he did alive at Richmond or in any of his palaces.” 

In the eighteenth century, one observer commented that “[t]his chapel, it has been said, was designed as a sepulchre in which none but such as were of the royal-blood should ever be interred; accordingly the will of the founder has been so far observed, that all that have hitherto been admitted are of the highest quality, and can trace their descent from some or other of our ancient kings.”  In the intervening years, some people not of aristocratic descent, including Oliver Cromwell, were buried there, but during the Restoration of the monarchy many of those people were disinterred.

Pendant fan vault 

The Henry VII Chapel is best known for its combination of pendant fan vault ceiling. Andrew Reynolds refers to the vault as “the most perfect example of a pendant fan vault, the most ambitious kind of vaulting current in the perpendicular period.” Notably, this ceiling was also the first to combine pendants with fan vaulting.

The fan vault is created by first dividing the ceiling into groin vaulted compartments. These groin vaults are created by the combination of arches along the wall and larger, transverse arches bridging the nave of the chapel. In the fan vault at the Henry VII Chapel, the compartments are nearly square in shape. The compartments are then ribbed and paneled. Ribs, of the same curve and size, are cut from single pieces of stone and rebated so to best fit with the panels. The curved ribs, extending from the same point on the wall, are spaced equidistant from each other, forming conoid shapes. The resulting conoids, however, require great compressive forces to keep shape.

Spandrels usually provide pressure along the upper edge of the conoids. In the Henry VII Chapel, these spandrels are replaced with hanging pendants. The pendants still provide the compression necessary to support the conoids and add complexity to the aesthetics of the room.

The pendants serve an additional structural purpose. The pendants are cut from single stones and inserted as wedge stones in the transverse arches. By combining with the transverse arches, the pendants do not require additional structural support.

At the time of the construction of the chapel, pendant vaults were very new; they were first seen in the Divinity School at Oxford.

Other architectural features
The chapel's architect is unknown, but it is believed that Robert Janyns the Younger was responsible for the design of much of the structure. The structure of the chapel is a three-aisled nave composed of four bays.  The aisles are divided by rows of mahogany stalls into the North, South, and Central aisles.  All contain numerous monuments and floor stones dedicated to various nobles.  Above the stalls, at the triforium level, are many sculptures.  Interspersed between the sculptures are the heraldic banners of the Knights of the Order of the Bath.  Above this is the clerestory, with three rows of smaller windows.  The window tracery articulates four larger windows, one in each bay, each composed of these three rows of smaller lancet windows.  As much of the original glass was destroyed during the English Commonwealth, the East Window, over the centre apsidal chapel, as well as the Donor Windows (in the west), in the chapels themselves, are new additions, installed in 2000 and 1995, respectively. The latter is the west window which depicts royal coats of arms, and was designed by John Lawson and made by Goddard & Gibbs. In 2013, two new stained glass windows designed by Hughie O'Donoghue were installed on either side of the East Window.

The apse of the chapel contains the altar, and behind that, the tombs of Henry VII and his wife as well as of James I.  There are five apsidal chapels.  These chapels originally contained altars—they were screened off and intended for private prayer for members of the royal family—but their dedication is no longer known.

Upon entering the chapel, one passes through a set of bronze gates, which are elaborately crafted and “illustrate the…intense determination of Henry VII to put to the forefront every possible indication of his claims to the crown of England.”  The gates are decorated with numerous royal crests that serve to legitimize his rule.  Once inside, the mahogany stalls stand out to the viewer as they contrast with the light colored stone of the walls and ceiling.  The stalls also contribute the verticality of the interior.  They date from different times; while some are original others were added later to accommodate the increasing number of Knights of the Order of the Bath.  The stalls were designated for all living Knights of the Most Honourable Order of the Bath.  When a knight was installed, he received a stall that was subsequently adorned with his crest, coat of arms, and heraldic banner, the last of which remained in the chapel even after the knight's death.  These banners all remain to decorate the chapel. During the nineteenth century, there were too many knights to accommodate in the chapel and no more were installed until the twentieth century.  Currently, only the most senior knights are assigned stalls in the chapel.

The altar and Henry VII's tomb were crafted by the same Italian artist, Pietro Torrigiano.  The Henry VII tomb was created first, beginning in 1512. The tomb was sculpted by a Florentine Renaissance artist, thus, the style is atypical of English art. The putti on the corners are particularly uncharacteristic.  The altar was begun in 1517, but Torrigiano left the country before it was completed; Benedetto da Rovezzano finished its construction in 1526.  Originally made of terracotta, white marble, and gilt bronze, it was destroyed during the Commonwealth.  The current altar is based on images of the original.  Two surviving pillars and two newly constructed ones support the reconstructed altar. Also significant are the aforementioned sculptures that adorn the triforium.  The statues are of saints and the Apostles.  According to Lindley, that “Henry VII’s will declares his trust in...‘Aungels, Archaungels, Patriarchs, Prophets, Apostels, Evangelists, Martirs, Confessours and Virgyns’” is critical to understanding his motivation in building the chapel: “Henry’s belief in the efficacy of ‘mediacions and prayers’ in his progress through purgatory is crucial to his purpose.”   That is to say, he built the chapel and adorned it with numerous sculptures of important religious figures in part to ensure his acceptance into Heaven.

People buried in the Henry VII Lady Chapel

 Anne, Queen of Great Britain
 Anne of Denmark, Queen of Scotland and England
 Anne, Duchess of York and Albany
 Anne de Mowbray, Duchess of York and Norfolk
 Antoine Philippe, Duke of Montpensier
 Arthur Penrhyn Stanley
 Caroline of Ansbach, Queen of Great Britain
 Catherine of Valois, Queen of England
 Charles II of England
 Edward V of England (presumed, identity not confirmed; also presumed to be buried at St George's Chapel, Windsor Castle)
 Edward VI of England
 Elizabeth I of England
 Elizabeth of York, Queen of England
 Elizabeth Cavendish, Countess of Devonshire
 Esmé Stewart, 2nd Duke of Richmond
 George II of Great Britain
 George Monck, 1st Duke of Albemarle
 George Villiers, 1st Duke of Buckingham
 Henry VII of England
 James VI and I
 James Butler, 1st Duke of Ormonde
 James Hamilton, 6th Earl of Abercorn
 James Hamilton, 7th Earl of Abercorn
 John Sheffield, 1st Duke of Buckingham and Normanby
 Ludovic Stewart, 2nd Duke of Lennox and 1st Duke of Richmond
 Margaret Beaufort, Countess of Richmond and Derby
 Margaret Douglas, Countess of Lennox
 Marie Joséphine, Countess of Provence (transferred to Cagliari Cathedral in 1811)
 Mary I of England
 Mary II of England
 Mary, Queen of Scots
 Oliver Cromwell (disinterred after the restoration of the monarchy)
 Richard of Shrewsbury, Duke of York (presumed, identity not confirmed; also presumed to be buried at St George's Chapel, Windsor Castle)
 William III of England
 Prince William, Duke of Gloucester

See also
Artists of the Tudor Court

Notes

References

Farrar, Dean and others (1895), Westminster Abbey and The Cathedrals of England. Philadelphia:John C. Winston & Co.
Henry, David. (1788) “An historical description of Westminster Abbey, its monuments and curiosities,” London, Eighteenth Century Collections Online, Gale Group, http://galenet.galegroup.com/servlet/ECCO
Heyman, Jacques (1996). Arches, Vaults and Buttresses. Variorum. 
Leedy, Walter C. (1975) “Design of the Vaulting of Henry VII’s Chapel, Westminster: A Reappraisal.” Architectural History 18, 5–96.
Leedy, Jr., Walter C. (1980). Fan Vaulting: A Study of Form, Technology and Meaning. Arts + Architecture Press. 
Lindley, Phillip. (2003) “Henry VII Chapel, Westminster Abbey.”  In Making Medieval Art, edited by Phillip Lindley.  Donington: Shuan Tyas. 
McDonnell, Joseph. (2008) “Stone, stucco and papier mache:fan vaulting from Henry VII’s chapel, Westminster Abbey, to Monkstown parish church.” In Studies in the Gothic Revival, edited by Michael McCarthy and Karina O’Neill. Portland: Four Courts Press. 
Tatton-Brown, Tim (2003). Westminster Abbey: The Lady Chapel of Henry VII. Boydell and Brewer. 
Trowles, Tony (2008).  Treasures of Westminster Abbey. Scala Publishers, Ltd.

External links
 Henry VII Lady Chapel – photos at The Courtauld Institute.

 Westminster Abbey – Official Website of Westminster Abbey

Chapels in London
Church of England church buildings in the City of Westminster
Westminster Abbey
Order of the Bath
Tudor architecture
English Gothic architecture in Greater London
16th-century Church of England church buildings
Henry VII of England